École secondaire l'Horizon is a French-language public secondary school located in Saint-Jean-Chrysostome, Quebec, Canada. It is located on Place Centre-ville in the downtown sector of Saint-Jean-Chrysostome and is run by the Commission scolaire des Navigateurs school board. Most of the school's students come from Saint-Jean-Chrysostome and Breakeyville, but some come from the districts of Saint-Romuald and Charny.

Sports facilities and football team

There is a soccer field that becomes a football field in fall.

The high school also has a football team called Les Phénix and there are other sporting teams with the same name at the school.

References

External links
 École secondaire l'Horizon
 Édu-groupe

l'Horizon
Education in Chaudière-Appalaches